In Jain cosmology, Gomukha is the guardian god or Yaksha (attendant deity) of Rishabhanatha, the first Tirthankara.

Legacy

Worship 
Gomukha along with Dharanendra is the most popular yaksha in Jainism.

Iconography 
According to Jain tradition, Gomukha is depicted as two or four armed yaksha riding on an elephant. As the name suggests, gomukha has the head of a bull. Gomukha carries a goad in left hand and noose in left. In other two lower arms gomukha carries varada and conch. The yaksha-yakshi pair sculptures of Gomukha-Chakreshwari are one of the most favoured along with Ambika-Sarvanubhuti and Dharanendra-Padmavati. The image of Gomukha yaksha in Ellora caves is noteworthy.

See also 

 Dharanendra
 Chakreshwari
Padmavati
Ambika

References

Citation

Source 
  
  
 
 
 
  
 

Heavenly attendants in Jainism
Rishabhanatha